Blackhorse Road is a joint London Overground and London Underground station, located at the junction of Blackhorse Road/Blackhorse Lane with Forest Road in Walthamstow, London, England. It is on the Victoria line of the London Underground and is the penultimate station on the eastern end of that line.

It is in Travelcard Zone 3 and is the least-used station on the Victoria line, with 6.44 million passengers per year. It is the closest railway station to Walthamstow Wetlands.

Ticket barriers control access to all platforms. Passengers using Oyster cards are required to tap on an interchange Oyster card reader when transferring between the two lines.

History
The station was opened by the Tottenham and Forest Gate Railway on 9 July 1894, and was originally situated east of Blackhorse Road. Its opening changed the local area from a gentrified London suburb to industrial, with several works and units opening around Ferry Lane to the northwest.

The Victoria line station opened on 1 September 1968, across the road from the mainline station. It was planned as a simple two-platform station, and was the only station on the line with any new structures above ground level. The surface line station was re-sited by British Rail on 14 December 1981, to provide better interchange with the Underground station.

The station today

Structure
The station contains two underground platforms for the Victoria line and two for the London Overground. Owing to budget restraints at the time of construction, the Underground station, like many stations on the Victoria line, was never completely finished to the standard of other lines. White ceiling panels were never fixed to the ceilings above the platforms; instead the steel tunnel segments were painted black and used to support the fixtures and fittings. This has had a detrimental effect on the lighting levels.

Artwork

There are two distinct works of art at the station, both depicting black horses, in reference to the station's name. One is in the form of a tile motif depicting a black horse on a white cameo against a light blue background, identical to the Victoria line's colour. It was designed by Hans Unger, who also did the tile motif at Seven Sisters tube station. The other is a mural of a black horse outside the station's entrance, by David McFall.

Services
During peak periods, trains run approximately every two minutes on the Victoria line (up to 33 trains per hour) in both directions.

The typical off-peak service for London Overground in trains per hour (tph) is:
4 tph westbound to 
4 tph eastbound to 

From June 2016 until February 2017, services on the route were suspended whilst it was electrified; this project involved lowering track in several places, rebuilding bridges and lengthening platforms as well as installing overhead wires. A replacement bus service was in operation for the duration of the closure period.

Connections
London Bus routes 123, 158, 230, W11 and night route N73 serve the station.

References

Sources

External links

Victoria line stations
London Underground Night Tube stations
Tube stations in the London Borough of Waltham Forest
Railway stations in the London Borough of Waltham Forest
DfT Category E stations
Former Tottenham and Forest Gate Railway stations
Railway stations in Great Britain opened in 1894
Railway stations served by London Overground
Walthamstow